Euproctis is a genus of tussock moths in the family Erebidae described by Jacob Hübner in 1819. Species are cosmopolitan, widespread throughout Palearctic, African, Oriental and Australian regions. Molecular phylogenetic studies indicate that the genus as presently understood comprises a large number of unrelated lineages (i.e., is paraphyletic), only a few of which have names (e.g., the genera Kidokuga and Sphrageidus), and is therefore in serious need of revision.

Description
Palpi obliquely porrect (projecting forward), reaching beyond the frons. Antennae bipectinated (comb like on both sides) in both sexes, where branches are long in males each with a spine to keep it in position with regard to the contiguous branch. Mid tibia with one pair of long spurs and hind tibia with two pairs. Female has a large anal tuft. Forewings with veins 3, 4 and 5 from near angle of cell. Vein 6 from or from below upper angle. Veins 7 to 10 are stalked, where vein 10 being given off towards apex. Hindwings with vein 3 and 4 stalked or from angle of cell. Vein 5 from above angle, and veins 6 and 7 stalked.

Species

Euproctis acatharta Turner, 1906
Euproctis acrita Joicey & Talbot, 1917
Euproctis actor Turner, 1920
Euproctis aganopa Turner, 1921
Euproctis albocillata Bethune-Baker, 1904
Euproctis albolyclene Holloway, 1999
Euproctis amagethes Collenette, 1930
Euproctis anisozyga Collenette, 1955
Euproctis annulipes (Boisduval, 1833)
Euproctis anomoeoptena Collenette, 1932
Euproctis anthorrhoea Kollar, 1848
Euproctis apatetica Collenette, 1930
Euproctis apoblepta Collenette, 1953
Euproctis aresca Collenette, 1955
Euproctis arfaki Bethune-Baker, 1910
Euproctis asaphobalia Collenette, 1932
Euproctis aspersum Felder, 1874
Euproctis aurantiicolor Rothschild, 1915
Euproctis bakeri Collenette, 1932
Euproctis baliolalis Swinhoe, 1892
Euproctis basalis (Moore, 1879)
Euproctis bicolor Walker, 1855
Euproctis bimaculata Walker, 1855
Euproctis bisecta Rothschild, 1915
Euproctis brunneipicta Collenette, 1930
Euproctis celebesica Strand, 1915
Euproctis cervina (Moore, 1877)
Euproctis chlora Joicey & Talbot, 1917
Euproctis chlorogaster Collenette, 1938
Euproctis chlorospila Joicey & Talbot, 1917
Euproctis chrysophaea Walker, 1865
Euproctis chrysorrhoea Linnaeus, 1758
Euproctis citrinula van Eecke, 1928
Euproctis conspersa (Felder, 1874)
Euproctis crocea Walker, 1865
Euproctis daures (Mey, 2007)
Euproctis dichroa Felder, 1861
Euproctis diselena Collenette, 1932
Euproctis dispersa (Moore, 1879)
Euproctis disphena Collenette, 1930
Euproctis edwardsii Newman, 1856
Euproctis emilei Griveaud, 1973
Euproctis emprepes Turner, 1931
Euproctis epaxia Turner, 1906
Euproctis epidela Turner, 1906
Euproctis eurybia Collenette, 1959
Euproctis euthysana Turner, 1902
Euproctis faceta Swinhoe, 1903
Euproctis fasciata Walker, 1855
Euproctis fimbriata Lucas, 1891
Euproctis flavicaput Bethune-Baker, 1904
Euproctis flavinata Walker, 1865
Euproctis flavipunctata Bethune-Baker, 1916
Euproctis fleuriotii (Guérin-Méneville, 1862)
Euproctis fraterna Moore, 1883
Euproctis fulvipuncta Hampson, 1893
Euproctis fusca Rothschild, 1915
Euproctis fusipennis Walker, 1862
Euproctis galactopis Turner, 1902
Euproctis gilvivirgata Collenette, 1932
Euproctis habbema Collenette, 1955
Euproctis hemicneca Collenette, 1955
Euproctis hemigenes Collenette, 1932
Euproctis holdingii Felder, 1874
Euproctis holoxutha Turner, 1902
Euproctis huntei Warren, 1903
Euproctis hylaena Collenette, 1955
Euproctis hymnolis Turner, 1921
Euproctis hypocloa Collenette, 1932
Euproctis idonea Swinhoe, 1903
Euproctis insulata Wileman, 1910
Euproctis iseres Collenette, 1955
Euproctis juliettae Griveaud, 1973
Euproctis kamburonga Holloway, 1976
Euproctis kanshireia Wileman, 1910
Euproctis kunupi Collenette, 1938
Euproctis latifascia Walker, 1855
Euproctis lativitta (Moore, 1879)
Euproctis leonina Turner, 1903
Euproctis limbalis (Herrich-Schäffer, 1855)
Euproctis limonea (Butler, 1882)
Euproctis lipara Collenette, 1930
Euproctis longipalpa Collenette, 1938
Euproctis lucifuga Lucas, 1892
Euproctis lunata Walker, 1855
Euproctis lutea Fabricius, 1775
Euproctis lyclene Swinhoe, 1904
Euproctis mahafalensis Griveaud, 1973
Euproctis mambara Bethune-Baker, 1908
Euproctis marginalis Walker, 1855
Euproctis marojejya Griveaud, 1973
Euproctis mayottensis Collenette, 1956
Euproctis meeki Bethune-Baker, 1904
Euproctis melania (Staudinger, [1892])
Euproctis melanorrhanta Turner, 1931
Euproctis melanosoma Butler, 1882
Euproctis mycoides Collenette, 1930
Euproctis nebulosa Rothschild, 1915
Euproctis nigribasalis Swinhoe, 1903
Euproctis niphobola Turner, 1902
Euproctis novaguinensis Bethune-Baker, 1904
Euproctis ochrea (Butler, 1878)
Euproctis ochrocerca Collenette, 1932
Euproctis ochroneura Turner, 1931
Euproctis ochropleura Collenette, 1932
Euproctis osuna Swinhoe, 1903
Euproctis parallelaria Bethune-Baker, 1904
Euproctis poliocerca Collenette, 1930
Euproctis postbicolor Rothschild, 1915
Euproctis pratti Bethune-Baker, 1904
Euproctis pseudoarna Holloway, 1999
Euproctis pulchra Bethune-Baker, 1908
Euproctis pulverea (Leech, 1888)
Euproctis purpureofasciata Wileman, 1914
Euproctis pyraustis Meyrick, 1891
Euproctis rhoda (Moore, 1879)
Euproctis rotunda Bethune-Baker, 1908
Euproctis sanguigutta Hampson, 1905
Euproctis sarawacensis Talbot, 1926
Euproctis schintlmagistri Holloway, 1999
Euproctis scintillans Walker, 1856
Euproctis seminigra Joicey & Talbot, 1916
Euproctis semirufa Joicey & Talbot, 1917
Euproctis semisignata Walker, 1865
Euproctis similis Füssli, 1775
Euproctis squamosa Walker, 1855
Euproctis stenobia Collenette, 1959
Euproctis stenomorpha Turner, 1921
Euproctis straminicolor Janse, 1915
Euproctis subnobilis Snellen, 1881
Euproctis tetrabalia Collenette, 1930
Euproctis thiocosma Collenette, 1955
Euproctis titania Butler, 1879
Euproctis trispila Turner, 1921
Euproctis u-grisea Holloway, 1976
Euproctis urbis Strand, 1925
Euproctis varians (Walker, 1855)
Euproctis venosa (Moore, 1879)
Euproctis virginea Bethune-Baker, 1904
Euproctis virgo Swinhoe, 1903
Euproctis viridoculata Holloway, 1976
Euproctis wilemani Collenette, 1929
Euproctis xuthoaria Collenette, 1955
Euproctis xuthoptera Turner, 1921
Euproctis xuthosterna Turner, 1924
Euproctis yulei Bethune-Baker, 1904
Euproctis zorodes Collenette, 1955

References

External links
 
 

Lymantriinae
Moth genera
Insect pests of millets